Senga Macfie also spelt as Senga MacFie (born 18 October 1968) is an English born Scottish former professional squash player. After retiring from playing professionally, she now coaches squash at Abercorn Sports Club in Edinburgh. She represented Scotland national women's squash team in several international competitions including the British Open Squash Championships, World Open Squash Championships and in World Team Squash Championships in a career spanning from 1993 to 2010. She achieved her highest career PSA ranking of 16 in January 1995 as a part of the 1995 PSA World Tour.

Career 
She also represented England women's junior team until 1992 before switching to play for Scotland. She won the inaugural European Squash Individual Championships which was held in 1990. She also emerged as winner of the 1984 British Junior Open Squash in women's U16 category and emerged as runners-up to England's Sue Wright at the 1986 British Junior Open Squash in women's U19 category. She joined the Professional Squash Association in 1993 and competed at the PSA World Tour until 2002. Senga also represented Scotland at the Commonwealth Games in 1998 and 2002. She was also part of the Scottish team which emerged as runners-up to England at the 2002 European Squash Team Championships. 
She is now a Squash coach and has helped kickstart the careers of household names such as Jathan Dick and Lain Ronald.

Runner up Scottish Women's Nationals 2023.

References 

1968 births
Living people
Scottish female squash players
Squash players at the 1998 Commonwealth Games
Squash players at the 2002 Commonwealth Games
Commonwealth Games competitors for Scotland
Sportspeople from London